Breakmaster Cylinder, also known as The Mysterious Breakmaster Cylinder or by the initials BmC, is a musical composer and producer who has provided title themes and background music for a number of radio shows and podcasts, principally with Gimlet Media's Reply All. Known for their pseudonymity, Breakmaster Cylinder does not make public appearances and has employed stand-ins for interviews, photographs, and other media appearances.

Development and early career

Breakmaster Cylinder grew up playing music, starting out on the piano, and learned to perform compositions by Johann Sebastian Bach, among others. They first began working with music sampling using ping-pong recording techniques between two cassette tape decks. Cylinder later acquired a keyboard with loop-recording capabilities and eventually began making DIY albums of trance music for friends. Cylinder spent more than a decade composing and producing music before finding a wider audience.

In their early days as a composer, Cylinder worked as a food delivery driver and often wrote music while parked on the side of the road. They produced many of their early works using a Novation Launchpad mini drum machine and Fruityloops software before switching to the Cubase digital audio workstation.

Breakmaster Cylinder self-released their first album, Spasmodic Symmetry, in 2006 and then the 2009 Logic Pro-driven Method Man-Monty Python mashup Dolomite! before being picked up by the label Breakbit Music. Breakbit helped issue several of Cylinder's early albums, including Say Hello to Klaus (2010) and See You Around (2011). In 2013 Cylinder started to get some press with the release of Big Schnitzel, an audio mash-up sampling food references made by the Notorious B.I.G. Aside from Bach as a recurring theme in their music and image, Breakmaster Cylinder has also cited Art Tatum, The Beatles, Nine Inch Nails, and Squarepusher as influences on their work.

Podcasting work

Cylinder's career took off after scoring the theme for TL;DR, an internet-themed segment hosted by Alex Goldman and PJ Vogt for the WNYC Studios public radio program On the Media. Goldman enlisted Cylinder as the show's composer after seeing a music video that they had made for their remix of The Chordettes' song "Mr. Sandman" set to a montage of film clips from horror cinema. Goldman and Vogt then brought Cylinder along to Gimlet Media when they started the podcast Reply All, for which Cylinder also composed the beginning and closing themes. In an interview for Hrishikesh Hirway’s podcast Song Exploder, Cylinder revealed that they derived Reply All's opening theme's chord structure from Bach's "Prelude in C Major" mixed with acoustically recorded drums, a MIDI-derived bass line, and the sounds of rolling jars, spinning coins, and a hammer shattering a small glass. By episode 16 of Reply All, Cylinder had contributed some 25 audio pieces to the show's music library for use as themes for various recurring segments, as well as music beds to convey moods in the show's journalistic pieces. These themes would grow to number in the hundreds by the time Reply All ran its final episode in June 2022. 

Cylinder also created satirical cut-ups from pieces of Reply All episodes that were run post-show as incentive for continued listenership though the podcast's end credits and final ad block. For one season of Reply All, this idea was expanded into a serialized audio story that appeared at the end of each episode. The space opera-esque serial featured Cylinder and a canine companion, known as "Dog", visiting alien planets while lost in outer space without any guidance from the internet. In 2020 Cylinder released the series as the album, BMC and Dog In Space: The Complete Series, via multiple online platforms.

Reply All's success led to Cylinder taking jobs creating themes for more than 60 other podcasts in the next three years, as well as music for film, advertisements, and video games. In 2015, Cylinder collaborated—via Twitter and Dropbox—with the Switched on Pop podcast to reconstruct then-current compositions by Justin Bieber. In 2018 Cylinder collaborated with fellow pseudonymous media artist Zardulu to produce the track "Ablanathanalba" following Reply All's exposé on Zardulu's viral Pizza Rat phenomenon. After an open-source theme for the Go Time podcast appeared in a Disney commercial, Changelog founders Adam Stacoviak and Jerod Santo commissioned Breakmaster Cylinder to compose and produce the theme music for all of The Changelog's podcasts as a means of ensuring that their theme music would be unique while also unifying the sound of all of the podcasts across the network.

Breakmaster Cylinder licenses all of their music through their own publishing company, Person B Productions. Since 2015 Cylinder has compiled their podcasting themes into several albums, each titled Songs for Broadcast followed by a volume number. In December 2022 Cylinder announced that the ninth volume would be the last because "it caps a trilogy of trilogies".

Albums and collaborators

Many of Breakmaster Cylinder's albums are thematic, and include mixtapes, collections of ringtones, and music made for podcasts. The 2014 album Pineapple Princess was partially derived from hearing Alanis Morissette’s music being played in supermarket produce sections. The 2017 album Pickled Beets Part III features a year's worth of weekly submissions to the Stones Throw Records beat-writing competition, Stones Throw Beat Battle. One of these submissions, "Drumcorpscore" was designed to be a backing track for Britney Spears’ song "Toxic". "Drumcorpscore" and many other of the weekly submission tracks were later repurposed, with samples removed, for use in scoring Reply All. Also in 2017, Cylinder remixed a version of the traditional folk song "Down by the Bay" as sung by popular children's music artist Raffi. Breakmaster Cylinder explained, "That song says it isn't safe to go home because Mom will say some crazy shit to you, which is a weird message for a children's song, but is actually how many adults I know feel about [going home for the holidays]." Cylinder released this, along with two other political songs on the Singable Songs For The Increasingly Enraged EP and included a note encouraging fans to donate to Planned Parenthood, an organization for which Cylinder had previously fundraised with their music. 

Cylinder has also been known to use their craft to mess with public radio culture as heard in their parodic remixes of radio themes such as that of Morning Edition and in a mash-up called "The NPR Drop" that one reviewer described as "a wonderfully bizarre amalgamation of dubstep, Lakshmi Singh, and the All Things Considered horns." In 2019 Cylinder collaborated with comedian Bec Hill on her live show I'll Be Bec.

Breakmaster Cylinder is a proponent of the indie music site Bandcamp through which they make all of their music available to stream or download. They frequently collaborate with rapper Dislotec.

Persona

Since Cylinder's earliest contributions to TL;DR, radio hosts have credited the composer as "The Mysterious Breakmaster Cylinder" and claimed to never have met nor spoken with them, nor to have any knowledge of who Cylinder actually is. Cylinder has perpetuated this mystique of pseudonymity in interviews stating, "I guess the anonymity is interesting", and, "My face (if I have a face) doesn't matter". In the final episode of Reply All, Cylinder revealed that they are a Taurus and have lived in three different sections of the United States.

During his time at Gimlet Media, Reply All host Alex Goldman asserted that he and his staff did not know Cylinder's secret identity. "I found him, or they—we don't really know—on the internet," he said in an interview with the Sydney Morning Herald. "I contacted him and he agreed to work with us, so long as he could remain anonymous." Jerod Santo and Adam Stacoviak from podcasting network The Changelog exclusively use Breakmaster Cylinder's music to score all of their shows, yet claim to not know if Cylinder is a "guy [or] girl—we're not sure if it's one person [or] many people."  For an interview with The Secret Room podcast, Cylinder fielded questions through a mix of flying saucer-style mashups of pop songs and an old Speak & Spell on the fritz. In an audio story about Breakmaster Cylinder's compositional and recording techniques, Song Exploder producer Hrishikesh Hirway states, "I interviewed Breakmaster Cylinder, but out of respect for his or her privacy and mystery, I had an actor replace Breakmaster Cylinder's voice...or did I?"

It has been speculated on Reddit that the name "Breakmaster Cylinder" is a portmanteau of "breakmaster"—a musician who works with breakbeats—and "master cylinder"—an automotive component that regulates the brakes of a car, truck, or motorcycle. When asked about their gender, Cylinder has referred to themself using the singular they pronoun. In photographs, Cylinder appears as a head shrouded in a black motorcycle helmet painted with white bug-eyes that are actually a pair of full stop marks that form the base of two exclamation points. Their head is shown on a variety of different bodies and gender expressions, and occasionally on a manipulated portrait of Johann Sebastian Bach. Despite their allure of secrecy, Cylinder has gained repute for responding to fan letters and being easily accessible via the internet.

Output

Albums

 Spasmodic Symmetry (2006)
 Dolomite! (EP, 2009)
 Remix One (2009)
 Say Hello to Klaus (2010)
 Musique Pour Les Pubs De Nourriture Pour Chiens (2011)
 See You Around (EP, 2011)
 BMC: Remixed (2011)
 Tokyo (EP, 2012)
 Blithering Heights (Mixtape, 2012)
 The BMC Fine Ringtones Collection (2013)
 Remix Two: Short Attention Span Theater (2013)
 Big Schnitzel (EP, 2013)
 Pineapple Princess (EP, 2014)
 Pickled Beets: Part I (2015)
 Songs For Broadcast: part I (2015)
 The BMC Fine Ringtones Collection: 2nd Issue (2015)
 Pickled Beets: Part II (2015)
 Songs For Broadcast: part II (2016)
 BMC: Live From Gimlet's Executive Washroom (2016)
 Songs For Broadcast: part III (2016)
 I Wanna Hear The Music (EP, 2017)
 Pickled Beets: Part III (2017)
 BMC ONE: Video Collection 2007–2017 (2017)
 Songs For Broadcast: part IV (2018)
 Singable Songs For The Increasingly Enraged (EP, 2017)
 Songs For Broadcast: part V (2018)
 Blithering Heights 2 (Mixtape, 2018)
 Songs For Broadcast: part VI (2018)
 Remix Three (2018)
 Mono Planet EP (2019)
 Songs For Broadcast: part VII (2020)
 BMC and Dog In Space: The Complete Series (2020)
 Breakmast of Champions (2020)
 Dead Legends OST (2021)
 Songs For Broadcast: part VIII (2022)
 Songs For Broadcast: part IX (2022)
 Mr. Stockdale (Film OST, 2023)

Singles with Dislotec

 "Solfeggio" (2015)
 "Superflypapertrailblazer" (2016)
 "Warning Signs" (2018)
 "Tiny Marshmallows" (2018)
 "Pitbull" (2018)
 "Westwood" (2018)
 "I Don't Wanna Talk To My Neighbors" (2019)
 "Zombies" (2019)
 "Dollar Of Damage" (2019)

Podcast and radio themes

 Absolutely Crushed
 AFK (Changelog)
 All Consuming
 The Axe Files {Cnn Audio)
 Battle Born Tech (KNVC FM)
 Be Less Typical
 Ben Franklin's World: A Podcast About Early American History (Omohundro Institute)
 {Blank}+{Blank}=Fun (Gimlet Media)
 Bleeped
 Blogtacular
 Business Casual (Morning Brew)
 Business/Disrupted
 The Changelog (Changelog Media)
 Completely Optional Knowledge
 Crazy Genius (The Atlantic)
 Creatures
 Darknet Diaries
 Decoder (Vox Media)
 Dedicate It
 Discomfort Zone
 The Drunk Projectionist
 The Europe Desk
 The Ezra Zaid Project
 Fabulous Flying Merkins (Indaba)
 Feminist Furies
 Fictional
 Footloose & Fancy Free
 For The Record
 Founder's Talk (Changelog)
 Gameplay
 Gender Reveal 
 Get More Smarter`
 Girl's Girls (Curvy Girl Media)
 Glow Girl (Curvy Girl Media)
 Go Time (Changelog)
 The Greatest Gift
 Hello Monday! (LinkedIn)
 Hit Enter: Stories from the Inbox
 The Hungry Fan
 Imagined Life (Wondery)
 Indie Romp
 Into It (Vox Media)
 Jobs Club
 JS Party (Changelog)
 Know It All
 <~> (Less Than, Approximately, Greater Than)
 Meat and Three (Heritage Radio Network)
 Meet Your Maker
 Met Nerds om Tafel
 Methods
 Moonshot (Lawson Media)
 Outside/In 
 Nothing Is Boring
 NZZ am Sonntag (NZZ)
 Ohrensessel
 Otakon
 The Payoff (Mic)
 Personal Best (CBC Radio)
 The Pitch (Gimlet Media)
 Play It Back
 PodSAM
 Practical AI (Changelog)
 Preserve This Podcast
 RehabCast
 Reply All (Gimlet Media)
 Request for Commits (Changelog)
 Reset (Vox Media)
 Sandwich Podcast (Sandwich)
 Sanity Podcast
 Say Something Worth Stealing
 The Secret Room
 Ship It (Changelog)
 Sidedoor (Smithsonian Institution) 
 Signl.fm
 The Soak
 Soapboxers 
 Special Relationship (The Economist)
 Sorry, What?
 Spotlight (Changelog)
 STEM Diversity Podcast
 Stories of Our Times (The Times)
 Switched On Pop
 Talking Points
 There Will Be Spoilers
 Think Again (Big Think)
 The Third Web
 The Ticket
 Time Well Spent
 TL;DR (WNYC Studios)
 Today Explained (Vox Media)
 True North
 Undefined
 UnMonumental
 We The Ppl
 Welcome to Macintosh
 With Good Reason
 Yarn Stories
 Yes Was
 Yesterday's Technology Tomorrow
 YM Answers
 You Can't Do That
 88% Parentheticals (Gimlet Media)
 100% Related? (Gimlet Media)

Contributions to other media

 Computer Show (scored "computer music" for 1980s TV spoof)
 Life's Wonders (RV series composer)
 MetaLetters DAO (Metaversal)
 Our Story - The Indigenous Led Fight to Protect Greater Chaco (contributed original music to 2022 documentary film)
 Pakistani Reactions (theme for video series)
 Slash Quest (Green Pillow/Noodlecake Games)

References

External links
 Breakmaster Cylinder on Bandcamp
 Breakmaster Cylinder on Discogs
 Breakmaster Cylinder on Free Music Archive
 
 Breakmaster Cylinder on Podchaser
Breakmaster Cylinder on SoundCloud
 Person B Productions, Breakmaster Cylinder's licensing company

American composers
American electronic musicians
American sound artists
Unidentified musicians
American podcasters
Gimlet Media